Mendelian traits behave according to the model of monogenic or simple gene inheritance in which one gene corresponds to one trait. Discrete traits (as opposed to continuously varying traits such as height) with simple Mendelian inheritance patterns are relatively rare in nature, and many of the clearest examples in humans cause disorders. Discrete traits found in humans are common examples for teaching genetics.

Mendelian model
According to the model of Mendelian inheritance, alleles may be dominant or recessive, one allele is inherited from each parent, and only those who inherit a recessive allele from each parent exhibit the recessive phenotype. Offspring with either one or two copies of the dominant allele will display the dominant phenotype.

Very few phenotypes are purely Mendelian traits. Common violations of the Mendelian model include incomplete dominance, codominance, genetic linkage, environmental effects, and quantitative contributions from a number of genes (see: gene interactions, polygenic inheritance, oligogenic inheritance).

OMIM (Online Mendelian Inheritance in Man) is a comprehensive database of human genotype–phenotype links. Many visible human traits that exhibit high heritability were included in the older McKusick's Mendelian Inheritance in Man. Before the discovery of genotyping, they were used as genetic markers in medicolegal practice, including in cases of disputed paternity.

Human traits with probable or uncertain simple inheritance patterns

See also
Polygenic inheritance
Trait
Gene interaction
Dominance
Homozygote
Heterozygote

References

External links
 OMIM Online Mendelian Inheritance in Man
 INTERSNP - a software for genome-wide interaction analysis (GWIA) of case-control and case-only SNP data, including analysis of quantitative traits.]
 GeneticInteractions.org

Human genetics
Classical genetics